Killing Eve: Die for Me is a 2020 thriller novel by British author Luke Jennings. It is the third and final installment in the Killing Eve series, following Codename Villanelle (2017) and Killing Eve: No Tomorrow (2018). The novel was published in the United Kingdom by John Murray as an e-book on 9 April 2020, followed by hardcover and paperback versions on 11 June and 12 November 2020, respectively. The novels are the basis of the BBC America television series Killing Eve (2018–2022).

Background
The first novel in the series, Codename Villanelle, is a compilation of four serial e-book novellas published between 2014 and 2016, and the sequel novel Killing Eve: No Tomorrow was published in 2018. Villanelle is a Russian orphan who, after murdering the killers of her gangster father, was rescued from prison by The Twelve and trained as a hitwoman and compensated with a luxurious life in the West. Villanelle becomes the quarry of British intelligence agent Eve Polastri.

Killing Eve: Die for Me was originally announced in July 2019 under the title Killing Eve: Endgame.

Premise
Preview synopsis includes: "As Villanelle returns to face her childhood demons and the Russian winter, Eve finds herself on the run from The Twelve, who want her dead. As the action moves between London and St Petersburg, and Eve and Villanelle finally admit their mutual erotic obsession, the chess game approaches its lethal, unforgettable conclusion."

The Killing Eve television adaptation
The television series Killing Eve stars Sandra Oh as Polastri and Jodie Comer as Villanelle. The show received critical praise, being renewed for a second season before its series 1 premiere and being renewed for a third series approximately 12 hours after the series 2 premiere.

Though the book is said to "diverge pretty clearly" from the television show, they still "share common DNA" because of Jennings' collaboration with the show's creators, the author remarking that he enjoys how the show's story line "entwines" with his own.

References

Killing Eve
2020 British novels
2020s LGBT novels
Action novels
British crime novels
British erotic novels
British LGBT novels
British novels adapted into television shows
British spy novels
British thriller novels
Feminist novels
John Murray (publishing house) books
Novels about serial killers
Psychological thriller novels
Sequel novels